Holiday Park was a football ground and greyhound racing stadium in Durham in England. It was the home ground of Durham City between 1923 and 1939.

History
Holiday Park opened in 1923 when Durham City left their Kepier Haughs ground. The club brought the wooden seated stand from the previous ground, which remained the only spectator facility at Holiday Park during the club's spell in the Football League. The first League match at the ground was played on 1 September 1923, with 4,000 spectators watching a 0–0 draw with Rochdale The ground's record attendance of 7,182 was set soon afterwards for an FA Cup qualifying match against West Stanley on 17 September 1923.

Durham were voted out of the Football League in 1928, and the last Football League match was played at Holiday Park on 5 May 1928, when 5,000 spectators saw Durham beat Crewe Alexandra 5–1. In 1937 a new 2,000 capacity stand was built as the ground was adapted for greyhound racing. This involved reducing the size of the pitch, and ultimately caused Durham City to fold in 1938. The ground was subsequently expanded as it continued to be used for greyhound racing. It was later demolished, with the site used by the electricity board.

Greyhound racing
Independent (unaffiliated to a governing body) greyhound racing took place at Holiday Park from 23 October 1937 with the ground undergoing improvements including a new 2,000 capacity stand. Racing ended in 1954.

References

Defunct football venues in England
Durham City A.F.C.
Defunct greyhound racing venues in the United Kingdom
Buildings and structures in Durham, England
Sports venues completed in 1923
English Football League venues
Sports venues in County Durham
1923 establishments in England